Eusiphona is a genus of freeloader flies in the family Milichiidae. There are at least four described species in Eusiphona.

Species
These four species belong to the genus Eusiphona:
 Eusiphona cooperi Sabrosky, 1955
 Eusiphona flava Sabrosky, 1953
 Eusiphona mira Coquillett, 1897
 Eusiphona vittata Sabrosky, 1982

References

Further reading

 

Carnoidea genera
Articles created by Qbugbot
Milichiidae